The 517 Class were small 0-4-2T tank engines designed by George Armstrong for local passenger work on the Great Western Railway. They were built at Wolverhampton Works and were outshopped between 1868 and 1885. They were built in thirteen lots commencing with 517–528 and ending with 1477–1488 in 1884–1885.

Dimensions
The class was far from uniform and encompassed three different wheelbases, saddle and side tanks, and various boilers to name just a few variations.

Summary table

History

The earlier ones were rebuilt from saddle tanks while the later ones were built as side tanks from the beginning. The 3571 Class were very closely related, its prototype being a minor rebuild of 517 class No. 1477 in 1895.  Then ten new locos followed in the next two years. Returning to the 517 class, various bunker and cab combinations also evolved, and after their last rebuilding, the locos with enclosed cabs and large bunkers were effectively the progenitors of Collett's 4800 class. In 1898, No. 1473 was named Fair Rosamund, to work a royal train on the Oxford-Woodstock branch. The locomotive was then regularly used for the Woodstock branch in subsequent years.

The Armstrong brothers
The independence of the brothers Armstrong is aptly symbolised by the fact that Joseph at Swindon preferred the 2-4-0T wheel arrangement (the 455 Class "Metro" Tanks) to the 0-4-2; George, on the other hand, built no 2-4-0Ts at Wolverhampton.

Use
In the 19th century, the 517s were principally Northern Division engines, and when new worked the Birmingham and Wolverhampton suburban traffic. Under Churchward the situation changed: about half of the class was fitted for autotrain working, and these engines were regularly maintained and moved around the system where needed; while the other, unconverted engines were demoted and became little more than shunters. Nevertheless as late as the 1920s the class was found in almost all parts of the GWR system. Most of the class ran between a million and a million and a half miles , No. 1163 holding the record at 1,652,661. None of the 517s were preserved, the last survivor No. 848 being scrapped in 1945 at the age of 70.

Coachwork
When autotrains were introduced on the GWR, a trial was made of enclosing the engine in coachwork to resemble the coaches. Nos 533 and 833 of this class were so equipped in 1906, as were two 2021 class 0-6-0Ts. The experiment was unpopular with engine crews, and the bodywork removed in 1911.

Accidents and incidents
On 15 April 1923, locomotive No. 215 was hauling Autocoach No. 70 when it was in a head-on collision with a goods train at Curry Rivel, Somerset due to a signalman's error. Nine people were injured.

Notes

References

0517
0-4-2T locomotives
Railway locomotives introduced in 1868
Standard gauge steam locomotives of Great Britain
Scrapped locomotives
Passenger locomotives